The Honda MT50 is an off-road styled moped, common in Scandinavia and the Netherlands but also sold in other countries including the United Kingdom and United States, that is more commonly known as the Honda MT5. Some countries had restricted versions designed to be ridden by learners. Production for European markets was mainly carried out in Belgium, Spain, and Sweden. Its leading competitor was the Yamaha DT50MX. Production started 1979 and ended 2000.

It stopped being imported in 1983 to be replaced by the Honda MTX50 but was reintroduced in 1990 (1985 in the UK). The reintroduced machine had a changed specification and underwent further regular updates in the next few years, meaning that not all parts were interchangeable. Its sister was the MB50/MB5 which was the road-styled version of the bike.

References
 Footnotes

Sources
 Honda MT50 Manual, 1997

MT50
Motorcycles introduced in 1979
Two-stroke motorcycles